

Designers 

The winning Design Star was Kim Myles, who went on to host Myles of Style. Kim and Todd each also won a new Mercury Mariner.
1 Age at the time of the show's filming

Contestant progress 

 (WINNER) The designer won America's vote and the competition.
 (RUNNER-UP) The designer lost America's vote and received second place.
 (WIN) The designer was selected as the winner of the episode's Elimination Challenge.
 (HIGH) The designer was selected as one of the top entries in the Elimination Challenge, but did not win.
 (IN) The designer was not selected as either top entry or bottom entry in the Elimination Challenge, and advanced to the next challenge.
 (LOW) The designer was selected as one of the bottom entries in the Elimination Challenge, but was not deemed the worst of the designers who advanced in that particular week.
 (LOW) The designer was selected as one of the bottom two entries in the Elimination Challenge, and was deemed the worst of the designers who advanced in that particular week.
 (OUT) The designer was eliminated from the competition.
 (OUT) The designer was eliminated outside of judging panel.

1 In the fourth episode, the designer with the worst design in the clients' eyes would be eliminated outside of the judging panel. The worst design was Christina's, and so she was cut.

Challenges

Challenge 1: Design a Las Vegas Penthouse 
The designers have 28 working hours and a $15,000 budget to design the Las Vegas penthouse where they will live during the competition.

Area designed:
Entrance Hall: Lisa
Living Room 1: Robb and Josh F.
Dining Pit: Kim and Scott
Living Room 2: Todd
Bar and Stairwell: Neeraja
Master bedroom: Will and Josh J.
Small Bedroom: Adriana and Christina
ELIMINATED: Lisa
First aired: July 29, 2007

Challenge 2: Dueling Kitchens 
The designers divide into two teams and each team has to make over a kitchen.

Teams:
Team 1: Adriana, Josh J., Kim, Neeraja (captain), Scott
Team 2: Christina, Josh F. (captain), Robb, Todd, Will
WINNER: Josh J.
ELIMINATED: Josh F., Neeraja
First aired: August 5, 2007

Challenge 3: .99 Reasons to Be Creative 
Each designer has a budget of $399 to decorate an empty room using items purchased at a 99-cent store.

WINNER: Todd
ELIMINATED: Scott, Adriana
First aired: August 12, 2007

Challenge 4: I Do--Vegas Style! 
The designers have to design a wedding reception for 75 guests.  After the designs are submitted, the couple will choose their favorite and least favorite designs.  The designer of the least favorite will be eliminated.  The remaining five will have sixteen hours to put everything together before the reception begins.

WINNING DESIGN (lead designer for the challenge): Robb
ELIMINATED: Christina (least favorite design), Josh J.
First aired: August 19, 2007

Challenge 5:  Designing for a Celebrity 
The remaining four designers have 24 working hours to design a guest house for Wayne Newton and his wife Kat.  Then they must each record a presentation of their room to show the judges how they will act on camera.

Teams:
Kitchen: Kim, Robb
Living room: Todd, Will
ELIMINATED: Robb
First aired: August 26, 2007

Challenge 6:  Design Star Gives Back 
The three remaining designers are each randomly assigned to a deserving family chosen by HGTV to receive a $10,000 makeover of any room.  Again, each must present the finished room to the judges, who will judge both the design and hosting ability.  One will be eliminated, and the remaining two move on to the final challenge and the nationwide vote for the next Design Star.

Placement:
Bridget & Parents: Will
Dean Family: Kim
Kelley Family: Todd
ELIMINATED: Will
First aired: September 2, 2007

Challenge 7: Island Dreams 
The final two designers each have a $10,000 budget to make over a hotel suite in Hawaii.  Some of the eliminated contestants return to help them out.  The final Design Star will be chosen from the viewers' voting.

First aired: September 9, 2007

Season 2 finale 
Kim is revealed as the viewers' choice for the next Design Star.

ELIMINATED: Todd
First aired: September 16, 2007

2007 American television seasons